Inez Hogan (August 5, 1895 – February 1973) was an American writer and illustrator of children's books, particularly animal stories.  She was born in Washington, D.C. and attended the Cape Cod School of Art.  She lived in Provincetown and New York City.

Hogan wrote 63 books, including many about her character Nicodemus.  She illustrated another 19 books, including the first edition of Epaminondas and His Auntie by Sara Cone Bryant. The black characters in Hogan's books were often portrayed with African American stereotypes.

From the 1930s until her death, children's books were her sole means of support. Of this she said "I can think of no happier way to make a living."

Inez Hogan died in February 1973 in Orleans, Massachusetts.

Books 
(partial list)
Animal Tales from the Old North State. Lucy M Cobb; Mary A Hicks; Inez Hogan. Publisher: New York, E.P. Dutton & Co., 1938.
A Bear is a Bear.  Inez Hogan. Publisher: New York : E.P. Dutton, 1953.
Bear Twins.  Inez Hogan. Publisher: New York, E.P. Dutton & Co., 1935.
Bigger and Bigger.  Inez Hogan. Publisher: Boston, D.C. Heath, 1946, 1955.
Cubby Bear and the Book.  Inez Hogan. Publisher: New York, Dutton, 1961.
Dinosaur Twins. Inez Hogan. Publisher: New York, Dutton, 1963.
A Dog for Danny. Inez Hogan; Liz Dauber. Publisher: Champaign, Ill., Garrard Pub. Co., 1973.
Eager Beaver. Inez Hogan. Publisher: New York, Dutton, 1963.
Elephant Twins. Inez Hogan. Publisher: New York, E.P. Dutton & Co., 1937.
Epaminondas and his Auntie. Sara Cone Bryant; Inez Hogan. Publisher: Boston: Houghton Mifflin, 1938.
The Four Funny Men. Erlin Hogan; Inez Hogan. Publisher: New York, E.P. Dutton & Co., 1939.
Fox Twins. Inez Hogan. Publisher: New York, Dutton, 1964.
Giraffe Twins. Inez Hogan. Publisher: New York, E.P. Dutton, 1948.
Little Lost Bear. Inez Hogan. Publisher: New York, Dutton, 1960.
The Little Ones. Inez Hogan. Publisher: New York, Dutton, 1956.
The Littlest Bear. Inez Hogan. Publisher: New York, Dutton, 1959.
The Littlest Satellite. Inez Hogan. Publisher: New York, Dutton, 1958.
The Lone Wolf. Inez Hogan. Publisher: New York, Dutton, 1961.
Me. Inez Hogan. Publisher: New York, Dutton, 1954.
Monkey See Monkey Do. Inez Hogan. Publisher: New York : E.P. Dutton & Co., 1960.
Mule Twins. Inez Hogan. Publisher: New York, Dutton & Co., 1939.
Nappy has a New Friend. Inez Hogan. Publisher: Dutton & Co., 1947.
Ned and Nancy. Inez Hogan. Publisher: Boston, Heath, 1955.
Nicodemus and the Goose. Inez Hogan. Schomburg Children's Collection. Publisher: New York: E.P. Dutton, 1945.
Nicodemus Runs Away. Inez Hogan. Publisher: Dutton, 1942.
Petunia Be Keerful. Inez Hogan. Publisher: Racine, Whitman, 1934.
Read to Me about Nono, the Baby Elephant. Inez Hogan. Publisher: New York : E.P. Dutton, 1947.
Runaway Stories: Folk Tales and Nursery Rimes. Inez Hogan. Publisher: New York: Newson & Co., 1928.
Twin Kittens. Inez Hogan. Publisher: New York, Dutton, 1958.
Twin Lambs. Inez Hogan. Publisher: Dutton, 1951.
Twin Otters and the Indians. Inez Hogan. Publisher: New York, Dutton, 1962.
We Are a Family. Inez Hogan. Publisher: New York Dutton, 1952.

References

External links
Biography and bibliography
Guide to the Inez Hogan papers at the University of Oregon

1895 births
1973 deaths
American children's writers
American women illustrators
American illustrators
American women children's writers
20th-century American women artists
20th-century American people